Hindle is a surname. Notable people with the surname include:

Abel James Hindle (1870–1954), Canadian farmer and politician
Art Hindle (born 1948), Canadian actor and film director
Ben Hindle (born 1974), Canadian bobsledder
Bradley Hindle (born 1980), Maltese squash player
Emma Hindle (born 1975), British equestrian
Frank Hindle (born 1925), English footballer
Frederick Hindle (disambiguation), multiple people
John Hindle (1857–?), Australian politician
John Hindle (businessman) (1934 - c. 2013), British property developer and Olympic Games hockey player
Kathleen Hindle (born 1948), Scottish chess master
Madge Hindle (born 1938), English actress
Matt Hindle (born 2007), English media star
Matt Hindle (born 1974), Canadian bobsledder
Owen Hindle (born 1940), English chess master
Tom Hindle (1921–2011), English footballer
Will Hindle (1929–1987), American filmmaker